Arthur Percy Andrews (12 June 1922 – 28 February 1985) was an English footballer.

1922 births
People from Alton, Hampshire
1985 deaths
English footballers
Association football defenders
Portsmouth F.C. players
York City F.C. players
English Football League players